David Michael Maas (March 15, 1963 – November 22, 2020) was an American magician, circus performer, and entertainer.

Early life
Maas was born in Missouri. His father was the music director of the Sarasota-based Circus Hall of Fame; his mother was a singer and performer.

Career
He began his career as a magician and worked for the Big Apple Circus as a ringmaster, singer, and emcee. Maas was part of the “A Magical Transformation,” and “Quick Change,” both magical performances he founded in 1996 with his wife, Dania Kaseeva.

ESPN named Maas and his wife “the most successful halftime act in sports” in 2011. In 2014, Sporting News named them the “best halftime show in basketball.”  They were named entertainers of the year at the Showboat Casino, Atlantic City.

They performed on Oprah, The Ellen Degeneres Show and for Queen Elizabeth, in the Royal Variety Performance, and former President George H. W. Bush, who had them at his home for at least three live performances. The act’s 2006 performance on America's Got Talent was noted when Maas defended the routine to Piers Morgan’s criticism.

He performed in all 30 of the NBA’s arenas, with a contract for halftime performances, as well as 15 WNBA arenas and more than 75 university stadiums.   Maas was a consultant for Katy Perry and trained her on quick costume changes.

Death
Maas died from COVID-19 at a Chicago area hospital on November 22, 2020, during the COVID-19 pandemic in Illinois. He was 57.

References 

1963 births
2020 deaths
American magicians
Deaths from the COVID-19 pandemic in Illinois